Time On My Hands is an oral history archive which is lodged with the three Holderness museums of Hedon, Hornsea and Holderness in the East Riding of Yorkshire, England.

Over 60 hours of local interviews are held and available to view at the museums, which give a snapshot of how life used to be in this remote area of East Riding of Yorkshire in the first part of the twentieth century.

Holderness
Museums in the East Riding of Yorkshire